Thomas Ziegler (born June 9, 1978) is a Swiss former professional ice hockey player.

Biography
Ziegler was born in Zürich, Switzerland. As a youth, he played in the 1992 Quebec International Pee-Wee Hockey Tournament with a team from Zürich. He later played five games in the National Hockey League with the Tampa Bay Lightning during the 2000–01 NHL season, but did not score any points. He later won the National League A championship with SC Bern in the 2003–04 NLA season.

Career statistics

Regular season and playoffs

International

References

External links

1978 births
Living people
Ice hockey players at the 2006 Winter Olympics
Olympic ice hockey players of Switzerland
SC Bern players
Ice hockey people from Zürich
Swiss ice hockey centres
Tampa Bay Lightning players